The Taiwanese American Foundation of San Diego is an organization for people of Taiwanese descent in the San Diego, California area.

The Taiwanese American Foundation of San Diego (TAFSD) was founded in 1996 with the dedication and commitment of the Taiwanese American Community in San Diego. TAFSD is incorporated in the State of California as a nonprofit, public, and charitable organization. Donations to TAFSD are tax deductible. The Taiwanese American Community Center (TACC) is an operational unit of TAFSD.

External links
 Taiwan Center SD - English homepage

Asian-American culture in San Diego
Organizations based in San Diego
Taiwanese-American culture in California